Kansas City 8: Get Together is a 1979 studio album by Count Basie.

Track listing
"Ode to Pres" (Clark Terry) – 4:07
"Basie's Bag" (Count Basie, Ernie Wilkins) – 9:45
"Swinging on the Cusp" (Terry) – 5:41
"Like It Used to Be" (Basie) – 8:29
"My Main Men" (Basie) – 6:10
"Pretty Time: "I Can't Get Started"/"What Will I Tell My Heart"/"Talk of the Town"/"I Can't Give You Anything But Love"/"I'm Confessin' (That I Love You)" (Ira Gershwin, Vernon Duke)/(Irving Gordon, Jack Lawrence, Peter Tinturin)/(Jimmy McHugh, Dorothy Fields)(Doc Daugherty, Al J. Neiburg, Ellis Reynolds) – 9:35

Personnel
 Count Basie - piano
 Budd Johnson - baritone saxophone, tenor saxophone
 Eddie "Lockjaw" Davis - tenor saxophone
 Clark Terry - trumpet, flugelhorn
 Harry "Sweets" Edison - trumpet
 Freddie Green - guitar
 John Clayton - double bass
 Gus Johnson - drums

References

1979 albums
Count Basie albums
Pablo Records albums
Albums produced by Norman Granz